Thaumeledone gunteri is a species of small, benthic, deep-sea octopus found in the bathyal zone in the Southern Ocean near South Georgia.

Description
The background colour is whitish, but the dorsal and ventral surfaces are covered by large, irregular, deep purple tubercles. The web linking the arms is uniformly pale. The head is narrower than the mantle, with several large tubercles above the eye. The eight arms are joined by a deep web, with about 35 small suckers on each arm. The funnel organ is "VV"-shaped and there are five elements in the radula. The posterior salivary gland, a diagnostic feature in this genus, has a diameter of 11 mm.

Phylogenetic relationships
The funnel organ in T. gunteri is similar to that in Thaumeledone peninsulae and they both share a characteristic loop in the rectum. Thaumeledone rotunda is a circumpolar species found at greater depths and has several morphological features differing from the other two species. Despite this, a phylogenetic study undertaken in 2008 of the molecular relationships in the genus, determined that T. gunteri and T. rotunda are sister taxa and that T. peninsulae is more distantly related.

Distribution

References

Octopodidae
Molluscs described in 1930